Vitas Gerulaitis won in the final 6–4, 3–6, 6–3, 6–2 against Andrew Pattison.

Seeds

  Tom Gorman (semifinals)
  Balázs Taróczy (semifinals)
  Andrew Pattison (final)
  Bob Hewitt (second round)
  Raymond Moore (quarterfinals)
  Hans Kary (quarterfinals)
  Frew McMillan (second round)
  Christian Kuhnke (first round)

Draw

Final

Section 1

Section 2

External links
 1974 Stadthalle Open Draw

Singles